Ghanta Naveen Babu (born 24 February 1984), known professionally by his screen name Nani, is an Indian actor, producer, and television presenter primarily known for his work in Telugu cinema. He is the recipient of two Nandi Awards, two Filmfare Award for Best Actor (Critics) – Tamil and a Best Hero award at the 2013 Toronto After Dark Film Festival, and also three Filmfare Best Actor nominations. Working over 28 Films, He has won Two Nandi Award, Two Filmfare Award South and Four SIIMA Awards Respectively.

Nani has established himself in Telugu cinema with Ashta Chamma (2008), Ride (2009), Bheemili Kabaddi Jattu (2010), Ala Modalaindi (2011), Pilla Zamindar (2011), Eega (2012), Yeto Vellipoyindhi Manasu (2012), Yevade Subramanyam (2015), Bhale Bhale Magadivoy (2015), Krishna Gaadi Veera Prema Gaadha (2016), Gentleman (2016), Majnu (2016), Nenu Local (2017), Ninnu Kori (2017), Middle Class Abbayi (2017), Devadas (2018), Jersey (2019), Nani's Gang Leader (2019), Shyam Singha Roy (2021) and Ante Sundaraaniki! (2022).

In 2013, Nani produced his first film, D for Dopidi, which became a commercial success at the box office. In 2018, his second production venture under the banner of Wall Poster Cinema, Awe was also a critical and commercial success. In the same year, Nani hosted the second season of the Telugu reality TV show Bigg Boss. His performance in Jersey (2019)  is regarded as one of the "100 Greatest Performances of the Decade" by Film Companion.

Early and personal life 
Nani was born and brought up in Hyderabad, India. He did his schooling from St. Alphonsa's High School and then did his intermediate at Narayana Junior College, S. R. Nagar before graduating from Wesley College.

In 2012, Nani married Anjana, after five years of courtship. Their son was born in 2017.

Career

Career beginnings and struggle (2008–2011) 
As an undergraduate, Nani got addicted to movies, citing Mani Ratnam as a major influence. He wanted to become a director, however, producer Anil Kumar Koneru allowed him to work on his production, Radha Gopalam (2005), as a "clap director", alongside director Bapu. He then worked for films including Allari Bullodu (2005), Astram (2006), and Dhee (2007). Nani took a sabbatical to work on a film script. Bhargavi Mallela, a friend of his, who was then working as a RJ for World Space Satellite, offered Nani work as an RJ. He accepted the offer and worked there for one year, hosting a program named "Non-Stop Nani".

Director Mohan Krishna Indraganti noticed Nani in an advertisement and offered him a role in the aforementioned film Ashta Chamma, also starring Swati Reddy. Ashta Chamma was well received by critics and Nani's performance was praised by them. Sify.com wrote "Nani has a very good screen presence. He has good emotions and dances well, though his body language sometimes reminds of Subhalekha Sudhakar – May this be treated as a compliment to the ease that the veteran actor shows on the screen! His addiction is good too." His second film, Ride, was produced by Bellamkonda Suresh, with Tanish, Swetha Basu Prasad and Aksha Pardasany playing important roles. Ride was also a notable success at the box office. He next starred in Satyam Bellamkonda's film Snehituda... opposite Maadhavi Latha. Snehituda... opened to negative reviews and the film was a flop at the box office. In 2010, he played the main role in the film Bheemili Kabaddi Jattu, a remake of Vennila Kabadi Kuzhu, with Saranya Mohan reprising her role as the heroine. The film opened to positive reviews with Nani's performance receiving appreciation. Rediff said Nani "perfectly fits into the role" and commented him for selecting the script, and Oneindia Entertainment commented that Nani "has given his best" and "suited perfectly to the role". The film was a surprise hit at the box office.

Breakthrough and initial success (2011–2012) 
His first release in 2011, Ala Modalaindi, was a romantic comedy written and directed by Nandini Reddy. Nithya Menen was the female lead of the film, making her debut in Telugu. Nani's performance in the film received positive reviews, with critics noting that he was "completely natural" and "living [his] role". The film was a blockbuster at the box office. Simultaneously he did a Tamil film, Veppam, with his friend Anjana as director which marked his debut in Tamil cinema. Veppam received mixed reviews, but Nani and Bindu Madhavi were appreciated. The Times of India called their debuts "confident" while Sify called Nani's performance "riveting". It was dubbed into Telugu as Sega. Both the versions were flops at the box office. Nani's final release of 2011 was Pilla Zamindar, in which he reunited with fellow Ashta Chamma actor Srinivas Avasarala. Pilla Zamindar opened to mostly positive reviews from critics, and Nani's performance as a spoilt-brat-turned-leader was well appreciated. Rediff wrote "Pilla Zamindar is Nani's show all the way. He lives up to the role and is able to portray the kaleidoscope of emotions demanded of him. " IndiaGlitz wrote, "Performance-wise, Nani delivers a matured output in the second half as a youth in self-introspecting and self-correcting mode." The film was a hit at the box office, prompting a Tamil dubbed release under the title Jameen. Nani's next release was S. S. Rajamouli's live action project Eega. Shot simultaneously in Tamil as Naan Ee, it featured Nani, Samantha Ruth Prabhu and Kannada actor Sudeep. Eega received a positive response. IBN Live said that "Nani sizzles as the lover boy in the few scenes he is seen", while Rediff said that he "makes a mark in his brief role". The film was a blockbuster at the box office and was dubbed into Hindi as Makkhi and into Malayalam as Eecha.

His last release in 2012 was Gautham Vasudev Menon's Yeto Vellipoyindhi Manasu opposite Samantha Ruth Prabhu once again. It was the simultaneously shot Telugu version of the Tamil film Neethane En Ponvasantham which featured Jiiva in place of Nani. Nani made a guest appearance in the Tamil version too. His portrayal of Varun Krishna was highly appreciated by critics. The Hindu wrote "Nani rises to the occasion with a mature performance. He speaks volumes through his eyes and conveys Varun's thoughts through the smallest of mannerisms. The climax completely belongs to him." IndiaGlitz wrote "If Samantha's maturity as an actor is obvious, Nani's knack is equally brilliant. He is quintessentially natural and is almost impeccable. The way he sings "Priyatama Neevachata Kushalama" sets the stage for a performance that deserves a big round of applause." His performance in Yeto Vellipoyindi Manasu is considered to be one of his best performances till date. IndiaGlitz while reviewing the Telugu version of his 2014 Tamil film Aaha Kalyanam wrote: "Nani's best-ever act is 'Yeto Vellipoyindi Manasu' and he may not better that act soon, that is in a similar role". Though the film received mixed reviews from film critics, it had a positive response at the box office, especially in multiplexes due to Nani and Samantha's performances.

Commercial fluctuations (2013–2015) 

In 2014, Nani was first seen in Krishna Vamsi's Paisa. The film revolved around the power of money and its influence over everything in society. Nani played the role of Prakash, a Sherwani model who is obsessed with gaining money. The film opened to negative reviews, yet Nani's performance was appreciated by critics. The Hindu wrote, "Nani holds the film together and proves his merit yet again. He shuns all the refinement he showed in his previous romantic characters and breathes life into the part of a smart Alec threatening to hold up the shooting of a sherwani commercial for Rs. 200 more. The film's highlight is the scene where he chances upon bags of cash and his reaction after that." The film was a disaster at the box office. He next starred in Yash Raj Films' maiden south Indian production Aaha Kalyanam, the Tamil remake of the 2010 Hindi film Band Baaja Baarat (also produced by Yash Raj Films). It was partly shot simultaneously in Telugu under the same title.  The film received mixed to negative reviews, but Nani's performance as Shakti was well received. Sify called his performance "pitch-perfect". While IndiaGlitz wrote, "Nani is the apple of everyone's eyes once again, adding a good dose of humour in his presence". Behindwoods commented that "Aaha Kalyanam provides great scope for the leads and Nani, who is known for his intense roles, fits the character of a carefree youth perfectly, with his broken English and casual attitude." This movie was a commercial failure. In 2015, Nani played a dual role for the first time in the political thriller film Janda Pai Kapiraju, co-starring Amala Paul.  The film was simultaneously made in Tamil as Nimirndhu Nil with Jayam Ravi in Nani's role. This movie was a disaster at the box office.

Critical acclaim and stardom (2015–2016) 

Another release of his, Yevade Subramanyam was also released on the same date of Jenda Pai Kapiraju to a majority of positive response and reviews and was commercially successful. Sangeetha Devi of The Hindu wrote "Nani is a fine actor and lives the part of Subramanyam, mirroring the insecurities of the work force caught in a rat race. As he sheds the corporate mask, he comes into his own, one step at a time on the mountains." On 4 September 2015, Nani's Bhale Bhale Magadivoy hit the screens. It was directed by Maruthi and produced by Geetha Arts in association with UV Creations. The movie received positive responses from critics. Pranita Jonnalagedda of The Times of India gave the film 3.5 out of 5 stars, who stated that Bhale Bhale Magadivoy comes across as a "breath of fresh air" because it "successfully keeps itself away from the regular formula of romantic comedies [and is] devoid of the oh-so-overused cliches" and is a "delight for anyone looking for wholesome entertainment". The film was a blockbuster at the box office and went on to become the fourth-highest grossing Telugu film of all time at the United States box office. It was also Nani's second blockbuster since Rajamouli's Eega and the first blockbuster in which Nani played a full-length role.

In 2016, his first film was Krishna Gaadi Veera Prema Gaadha. A romantic comedy interlaced with an adventure thriller film set on a rural backdrop written and directed by Hanu Raghavapudi and produced under the banner of 14 Reels Entertainment saw newcomer Mehreen Pirzada as the female lead. The film opened with positive response from critics, Sangeetha Devi Dundoo of The Hindu while giving the movie 3 out of 5 stars said that "Hanu Raghavapudi proves his mettle with Krishna Gaadi Veera Prema Gaadha and makes it an entertaining watch". It was praised for the performances of the cast and criticized for the excessive runtime. The movie fared really well at the box office. Thus, became Nani's biggest opener in India, beating the records of his last film Bhale Bhale Magadivoy.

Nani's second release in 2016 was Gentleman, a romantic murder mystery thriller directed by his mentor Indraganti Mohan Krishna, who introduced him with Ashta Chamma. Nani played dual role in the film. Surbhi and Nivetha Thomas starred alongside Nani in the movie, with Nivetha having more of a pivotal and prominent role. The movie was released to positive reviews and went on to become Nani's 3rd highest grosser after Eega and Bhale Bhale Magadivoy. Gentleman was praised for the performances but criticized for its predictability. Nani's versatility was praised as GreatAndhra wrote that he was "brilliant from his role as a street-smart youngster to an obscure businessman."

His last release in 2016 was a romantic comedy titled Majnu. Directed by Uyyala Jampala fame Virinchi Varma, the film saw Nani co-star alongside Anu Emmanuel and Priya Sri. The film was one of Nani's weakest films since Yevade Subramanyam. Praised for its comedy and criticized for its lengthiness and weak story, Majnu was given mixed reviews, and collected 58.4 crores and emerged as a hit.

Commercial success (2017–present) 

Nenu Local (2017), directed by Trinadha Rao Nakkina, cast Nani alongside Keerthy Suresh. This movie was given average reviews from the critics, who said that despite the predictability, despite the boring story, despite all the tiring commercial elements, Nani's performance changed everything for the film and led it towards becoming a success. It emerged as a blockbuster, collecting over fifty crores, and became Nani's highest-grossing film (excluding Eega) to date.

Ninnu Kori (2017) was a film that had Nani co-starring alongside Nivetha Thomas once more, and the film also had Aadhi Pinisetty in a pivotal role. This film emerged in response to generally positive reviews, being praised for its music, cinematography, and conventionally different love story. It was criticized for its lengthiness and predictability. It became a hit and was Nani's second-highest-grossing film, excluding Eega.

The next and last film released in 2017 was Middle Class Abbayi, directed by Venu Sree Ram. in which Nani co-starred alongside Sai Pallavi of Fidaa fame. This movie was again given strictly average reviews, saying that the story was very conventional and that the music and Nani and Bhumika's performance were the highlights of the film. The film was a Blockbuster at the Box office. The film went on to gross more than 70 crores and became the 7th highest-grossing Telugu film of 2017, becoming the highest-grossing Nani film (excluding Eega), again.

His next project was Krishnarjuna Yudham, which released on 12 April 2018. This film was Nani's first failure after 8 consecutive successes at the box office. It was praised for Nani's performance but criticized for the length, the rockstar role, the commercial elements, and lack of convincing screenplay. The film flopped, becoming a disaster, failing to recover 18 of the 30 crores in the budget. His next release was Devadas, a comedy multistarrer in which he played the role of a doctor, and it was released on 27 September 2018. He starred alongside star actor Nagarjuna, who was a don. It was praised for being fun but criticized for having a thin story. It was an Average at the box office due to the relatively big budget and strictly average word of mouth. Nani's first release in 2019 was Jersey, which opened to positive reviews from both critics and Audiences and became a feel good hit at the box office, collecting nearly 65 crores. His next release in 2019 was Gang Leader, which was released on 13 September 2019 to positive reviews. His next project was his 25th film, V, directed by Mohan Krishna Indraganti. Nivetha Thomas, Aditi Rao Hydari, and Sudheer Babu, co-starred with him, in which he played a character with negative shades. The film received mixed-to-negative reviews with praise towards Nani's performance, cinematography, and background music, but criticism towards the story, screenplay, and direction. He next appeared in Tuck Jagadish, alongside Ritu Varma. It was directed by Shiva Nirvana, marking his second collaboration with him after, Ninnu Kori. The film received negative reviews with criticism towards the story, screenplay, direction, background music, and characters.

Nani's next was the period romantic drama, Shyam Singha Roy. It was directed by Rahul Sankrityan, of Taxiwaala fame. It released, theatrically, on 24 December 2021 and received mixed-to-positive reviews. The story, performances of the entire cast, background score, art design, cinematography, and visual effects were highly praised. The film was a sleeper-hit at the box office, marking the comeback of Nani, after the back-to-back failures of V and Tuck Jagadish. It was the last successful film of 2021, released after Pushpa: The Rise.

Nani was next seen in Vivek Athreya's directorial, Ante Sundaraniki, alongside Malayalam actress, Nazriya Nazim, making her debut in Telugu cinema. Upon release, it received positive reviews with praise towards performances of the cast (especially Nani and Nazim), screenplay, writing, cinematography, and the background score. However, criticism was directed towards the film's long duration and pace. Despite receiving positive reviews, the film failed at the box office and ended up as a below-average grosser. 

He will be next seen in Dasara, alongside Keerthy Suresh, marking their second collaboration after Nenu Local. It is directed by debutant, Srikanth Odela.

After Dasara, He will be next seen in '#Nani30' (Title yet to be announced), Starring ‘Natural Star’ Nani &  Mrunal Thakur in the lead roles, Written & Directed by Shouryuv. Produced by Mohan Cherukuri(CVM), Dr. Vijender Reddy Teegala and Murthy K S under Vyra Entertainments banner. Music by Hesham Abdul Wahab.

In the mid-credits scene of HIT: The Second Case, Nani's character, Arjun Sarkaar, was introduced into the HIT Verse. He will be the new lead in the sequel, HIT: The Third Case.

Filmography

Other works 
Nani turned producer for the film, D for Dopidi, in 2013. It was co-produced by director duo, Raj Nidimoru and Krishna D.K.. It starred Sundeep Kishan, Varun Sandesh, and Naveen Polishetty. He also lent his voice to the film. The film was a moderate success at the box office. He launched his film production house, Wall Poster Cinema, along with costume designer, Prashanti Tipirneni, as a partner. The first film in the banner was Awe or "అ!" (2018). It was one of the most critically acclaimed films of the year and won 2 awards, at the 66th National Film Awards, for Best Special Effects and Best Make-Up Artist. 

In 2020, he produced crime thriller, HIT: The First Case, with Vishwak Sen and Ruhani Sharma. It was one of the bigger sleeper hits of the year, right before the COVID-19 pandemic occurred, worldwide, in March 2020. He has also produced the sequel, HIT: The Second Case, with Adivi Sesh and Meenakshi Chaudhary. These films are intended to be part of a universe, with upcoming films being set in various cities of Andhra Pradesh and Telangana. Only the fictional, Homicide Intervention Team (HIT), will be the common entity connecting all the films in the universe. 

In June 2018, Nani made his television debut by hosting the reality TV show Bigg Boss 2. He is the Brand Ambassador of Otto's Minister White.

Awards and recognition

References

External links 

 
 

Living people
Indian male film actors
Male actors in Tamil cinema
Indian male voice actors
21st-century Indian male actors
Nandi Award winners
Zee Cine Awards Telugu winners
Male actors in Telugu cinema
Male actors from Hyderabad, India
Telugu film producers
Film producers from Hyderabad, India
1984 births
Host Season 2